Rajasekhar Varadharajan (born 4 February 1962) is an Indian actor known for his works primarily in Telugu cinema. In a career spanning more than thirty-eight years, he has acted in over eighty films in a variety of roles. He starred in several notable films, including Talambralu, Sruthilayalu, Aahuti, Ankusam, Magaadu, Allari Priyudu, Anna, Omkaram, Suryudu, Sivayya, Manasunna Maaraju, Maa Annayya, Simharasi, Evadaithe Nakenti, Gorintaku, and PSV Garuda Vega. Rajasekhar won two Filmfare Best Actor Awards - Telugu for the Magaadu and Anna.

The Nature Waldorf School is owned by Rajasekhar and Jeevitha, to whom he is married. The school is affiliated to Dr. Rajasekhar Charitable Trust and started its operations in July 2010. The mission of the school is to impart non-commercialised education to students.

Early life 
Rajasekhar was born on 4 February 1962, in Lakshmipuram, Theni district of Tamil Nadu. While some sources reported that his mother tongue is Tamil, Rajasekher identifies himself as Telugu. His father, Varadharajan Gopal, who hailed from Chittoor district, worked as Sub Inspector of Police in Guntur district where his mother Andalu is from. They migrated to Tamil Nadu and later returned to Andhra. His brother Selva has also appeared in Tamil films as a lead actor. Before joining films, he studied M.B.B.S. and practiced in Aminjikarai, Chennai.

Rajasekhar is a practicing Saiva Hindu, after undergoing a transformative personal experience during his formative years.

Personal life
He married erstwhile actress Jeevitha and has two daughters. Their elder daughter Shivani debuted with Adbhutham, in 2021, their younger daughter Shivatmika debuted with Dorasaani, in 2019. Recently, Jeevitha was named as one of the nine members of the Central Board of Film Certification (CBFC), with Pahlaj Nihalani as chairman.

Career
Rajashekhar made his acting debut in Tamil with Pudhumai Penn (1984) and also had a character role in Puthiya Theerpu (1985) with Vijaykanth. His Telugu film debut was in 1985 with Vande Mataram. Since then, he has acted in variety of films such as Pratighatana, Repati Pourulu, Station Master, Sruthilayalu, Kashmora, Aradhana, Talambralu, Aruna Kiranam, Mamatala Kovela and Akka Mogudu.

Movies from which he rose to fame and created an image of an Angry Young Man of Tollywood are Ahuti, Aartanaadam Nyayam Kosam, Ankusam, Magadu, Rowdyism Nasinchali, Morotodu Na Mogudu, Anna, Papa Kosam, Balarama Krishnulu, Agraham, Sivayya, and Evadaithe Nakenti.

He has acted in more than 75 movies though he is mocked for his diction. His voice for most of his Telugu movies was dubbed by Telugu actor Saikumar till 1996 and then was taken over by Srinivasa Moorthy who started dubbing for him in 1997, when he won his first Nandi award for the movie Sivayya. Except for the 2003 film Villain, where Sai's younger brother P. Ravi Shankar dubbed for both Rajasekhar and Vijayan, respectively.

Later, he also gained fame for his family drama films such as Maa Aayana Bangaram, Suryudu, Simharasi, Maa Annayya, Deergha Sumangali Bhava, Manasunna Maaraju and Gorintaku. He was also applauded for his performance in the romance film Allari Priyudu.

He is considered a versatile actor. His performance in Omkaram is a classic example of that, which was directed by Kannada director Upendra. His electrifying performance in the movie Sheshu was applauded critically. His biggest hit of the career came in the year 2007 with Avadaithe Nakenti and his last genuine hit was Gorintaku in the year 2008. Since then, he has had no hits. His last film was a hit; PSV Garuda Vega in 2017.

Ithu Thaanda Police, the Tamil dub of Ankusam was a huge hit. He has since been offered more movies in Tamil, and his Telugu films were dubbed in Tamil such as  Magaadu as Meesaikaran.

Filmography

All films are in Telugu, unless otherwise noted.

Awards
 Nandi Award for Best Villain - Talambralu (1986) 
 Filmfare Award for Best Actor - Telugu - Magaadu (1990)
 Filmfare Award for Best Actor - Telugu - Anna (1994)

References

External links
 

Indian male film actors
Living people
Tamil people
Nandi Award winners
Filmfare Awards South winners
Male actors from Tamil Nadu
Tamil male actors
20th-century Indian male actors
Male actors in Tamil cinema
People from Theni district
Male actors in Telugu cinema
21st-century Indian male actors
1962 births